The 1990–91 season was the 67th season in the existence of AEK Athens F.C. and the 32nd consecutive season in the top flight of Greek football. They competed in the Alpha Ethniki and the Greek Cup. The season began on 26 August 1990 and finished on 2 June 1991.

Overview

In the 1990–91 season AEK Athens did not manage to claim any distinctions. The club was plagued by administrative problems and most of the season was part of the "transitional" period, as Zafiropoulos' ownership was coming to an end, since Stratos Gidopoulos never had any shares and he was only given the management of the club. As a result at the end of the season the Court of First Instance chose a temporary administration led by Kostas Generakis.

The team did not play in any European competition due to a ban from the previous season. The only things that stood out in this season were the victory in the derby against Olympiacos in Rhodes and a satisfying 6–0 win against Xanthi.

In the Greek Cup, the team was eliminated by OFI at the round of 16, as they paid their disastrous appearance at Theodoros Vardinogiannis Stadium. Their great performance at the second leg was not enough for the club for to qualify to the next round.

In a season that was quickly forgotten, AEK finished 3rd and their top scorer was Daniel Batista with 14 goals, who was decided to be framed by more capable teammates to continue the spectacular and offensive football of Dušan Bajević. The only positive elements of the season was the necessary time credit that was given to Bajević, to prepare the club's "comeback" on the following seasons. And the continuation was proved to be indeed compensating.

Players

Squad information

NOTE: The players are the ones that have been announced by the AEK Athens' press release. No edits should be made unless a player arrival or exit is announced. Updated 30 June 1991, 23:59 UTC+3.

Transfers

In

Summer

Out

Summer

Renewals

Overall transfer activity

Expenditure
Summer:  ₯0

Winter:  ₯0

Total:  ₯0

Income
Summer:  ₯0

Winter:  ₯0

Total:  ₯0

Net Totals
Summer:  ₯0

Winter:  ₯0

Total:  ₯0

Pre-season and friendlies

Alpha Ethniki

League table

Results summary

Results by Matchday

Fixtures

Greek Cup

Group 9
<onlyinclude>

Matches

Round of 32

Round of 16

Statistics

Squad statistics

! colspan="9" style="background:#FFDE00; text-align:center" | Goalkeepers
|-

! colspan="9" style="background:#FFDE00; color:black; text-align:center;"| Defenders
|-

! colspan="9" style="background:#FFDE00; color:black; text-align:center;"| Midfielders
|-

! colspan="9" style="background:#FFDE00; color:black; text-align:center;"| Forwards
|-

|}

Disciplinary record

|-
! colspan="14" style="background:#FFDE00; text-align:center" | Goalkeepers

|-
! colspan="14" style="background:#FFDE00; color:black; text-align:center;"| Defenders

|-
! colspan="14" style="background:#FFDE00; color:black; text-align:center;"| Midfielders

|-
! colspan="14" style="background:#FFDE00; color:black; text-align:center;"| Forwards

|}

References

External links
AEK Athens F.C. Official Website

AEK Athens F.C. seasons
AEK Athens